Joseph Perrault may refer to:

 Joseph Perrault (Lower Canada politician) (1789–1831), politician in Lower Canada
 Joseph-Stanislas Perrault (1846–1907), lawyer and political figure in Quebec